The 2021–22 Big Ten men's basketball season was the season for Big Ten Conference basketball teams that began with practices in October 2021, followed by the start of the 2021–22 NCAA Division I men's basketball season in November 2021. The regular season ended in March 2022.

With a win over Purdue on March 1, 2022, Wisconsin clinched at least a share of the Big Ten regular season championship. Illinois clinched a share of the regular season titled on March 6 when Wisconsin lost its final game to Nebraska and the Illini held on to beat Iowa. It marked the first conference championship for Illinois since 2005.

The Big Ten tournament was held March 9 through March 13, 2022 at Gainbridge Fieldhouse in Indianapolis, Indiana. Iowa won the tournament, defeating Purdue in the championship game.

Wisconsin forward Johnny Davis was named Big Ten Player of the Year. Wisconsin coach Greg Gard was named Big Ten Coach of the Year.

In addition to Iowa, who received the conference's automatic bid to the NCAA tournament, the conference's tied the previous year's record with nine teams receiving bids to the tournament: Illinois, Indiana, Michigan, Michigan State, Ohio State, Purdue, Rutgers, and Wisconsin.

Head coaches

Coaching changes

Indiana 
On March 15, 2021, Indiana fired Archie Miller after four years as head basketball coach. Two weeks later, the school named former Indiana player and New York Knicks assistant Mike Woodson as the new head coach.

Minnesota 
Following the season, Minnesota fired head coach Richard Pitino after eight years at the school. On March 23, the school named Minnesota alum and former Minnesota assistant coach Ben Johnson the new head coach.

Penn State 
Shortly before the start of the 2020–21 season, Penn State head coach Pat Chambers resigned due to allegations of inappropriate conduct. The school named assistant coach Jim Ferry interim coach. Following the season, the school hired Purdue assistant coach Micah Shrewsberry as the new head coach.

Maryland 
On December 3, 2021, Maryland and Mark Turgeon agreed to part ways effective immediately. Assistant coach Danny Manning was named interim coach.

Coaches

Notes: 
 All records, appearances, titles, etc. are from time with current school only. 
 Year at school includes 2021–22 season.
 Overall and Big Ten records are from time at current school only and are through the beginning of the season.
 Turgeon's ACC conference record excluded since Maryland began Big Ten Conference play in 2014–15. Turgeon left Maryland on December 3, 2021.

Preseason

Preseason Big Ten poll 
Prior to the conference's annual media day, unofficial awards and a poll were chosen by a panel of writers.

Preseason All-Big Ten 
Prior to the conference's annual media day, unofficial awards and a poll were chosen by a panel of writers.

Preseason watchlists
Below is a table of notable preseason watch lists.

Preseason national polls

Regular season

Rankings

 AP does not release a post-tournament poll.

Early season tournaments 
Of the 14 Big Ten teams, 10 participated in early season tournaments. All Big Ten teams participated in the ACC–Big Ten Challenge against Atlantic Coast Conference teams, the 21st year for the event. Eight teams participated in the Gavitt Tipoff Games.

Players of the week
Throughout the conference regular season, the Big Ten offices named one or two players of the week and one or two freshmen of the week each Monday.

Conference matrix
This table summarizes the head-to-head results between teams in conference play. Each team will play 20 conference games, and at least one game against each opponent.

Honors and awards

All-Big Ten awards and teams
On March 8, 2022, the Big Ten announced most of its conference awards.

Postseason

Big Ten tournament

NCAA Tournament

The winner of the Big Ten Tournament, Iowa, received the conference's automatic bid to the NCAA tournament. Nine Big Ten teams received bids to the NCAA tournament for the second consecutive year, the most of any conference in the tournament.

References